Emmet Park, also known as The Strand, is an urban park in Savannah, Georgia, United States. Monuments occupy several of the individual sections.

History
Formerly known as the Irish Green, established with the help of Wexford native William Kehoe, the park was named in 1902 for Irish orator Robert Emmet, in commemoration of the centennial of his death, although Emmet did not visit Savannah during his life.

Two memorials stand in Emmet Park: an Irish Celtic Cross memorial, a Vietnam War veterans memorial, a Korean War memorial, a Chatham Artillery memorial and a memorial to Dr. Noble Wimberly Jones.

Old Harbor Light also stands in the park, at its eastern extremity. It was erected in 1858.

The park is a focal point for Savannah's Saint Patrick's Day celebration, one of the country's largest after Boston.

Live oaks
The live oak trees that line the sidewalk between The Strand and Bay Street were first planted in 1857. They replaced rows of Chinaberry trees that were planted in the late 18th century.

Gallery

References

External links
Emmet Park information board, erected in 2003
Photos of Emmet Park

Urban public parks
Parks in Savannah, Georgia
1902 establishments in Georgia (U.S. state)